Phyllonorycter fraxinella is a moth of the family Gracillariidae. It is found from Germany and Poland to Sicily and Greece and from France to southern Russia.

The larvae feed on Genista germanica and Genista tinctoria. They mine the leaves of their host plant. They create a strongly inflated and folded, lower-surface, tentifrom mine.

References

fraxinella
Moths of Europe
Moths described in 1846